Strongyleria is a genus of flowering plants belonging to the family Orchidaceae.

Its native range is Assam to South China and New Guinea.

Species:

Strongyleria hirsutipetala 
Strongyleria leiophylla 
Strongyleria pannea 
Strongyleria pellipes

References

Eriinae
Podochileae genera